William Bernard Barry (July 21, 1902 – October 20, 1946) was an American lawyer and politician who served six terms a United States Representative from New York from 1935 to 1946.

Biography
Barry was born in County Mayo, Ireland and immigrated to the United States in 1907 with his parents, Thomas J. and Catherine J. (Hennelly) Barry, who settled in Queens County, New York. He attended public schools and graduated from New York University in 1925 and from New York University School of Law in 1929. He was admitted to the bar in 1929 and commenced practice in New York City. He married Emily B. La Mude on February 7, 1934.

Career
Barry served as assistant district attorney of Queens County, New York, in 1932 and 1933. He was special United States attorney for the Department of Justice between 1933 and 1935 and a member of the Democratic executive committee of Queens County between 1930 and 1935.

Congress 
Elected as a Democrat to the Seventy-fourth Congress to fill the vacancy caused by the resignation of William F. Brunner as representative for New York's second district, Barry was reelected to the Seventy-fifth and to the four succeeding Congresses and served from November 5, 1935, until January 3, 1945. Elected for the fourth district, he served from January 3, 1945 until his death on October 20, 1946.

Death
Barry died, from pneumonia, in St. Vincent's Hospital, New York, New York County, New York, on October 20, 1946 (age 44 years, 91 days). He is interred at Mount St. Mary Cemetery, Flushing, Queens, New York.

See also

 List of United States Congress members who died in office (1900–49)

References

External links

1902 births
1946 deaths
Politicians from County Mayo
People from County Mayo
Irish emigrants to the United States (before 1923)
People from Queens, New York
New York University School of Law alumni
New York (state) lawyers
Deaths from pneumonia in New York City
Democratic Party members of the United States House of Representatives from New York (state)
20th-century American politicians
20th-century American lawyers
Members of the United States House of Representatives from New York (state)